Neptunian exoplanets are similar in size to Neptune or Uranus in the Solar System. Neptunian exoplanets may have a mixture of interiors though all would be rocky with heavier metals at their cores. Neptunian planets typically have hydrogen- and helium-dominated atmospheres.

HAT 
HAT-P-26b

HAT-P-11b

GJ 
GJ 436b

TOI 
TOI-1231 b

Kepler 
Kepler-1625b

OGLE 
OGLE-2005-BLG-390L b

References 

Neptunian